Issam Jemâa is the all-time men's top goalscorer and a former Tunisia football player, Jemâa was called up to the 2006 World Cup, but was later forced out from the squad due to injury. He was also called up to the Tunisia national team for the 2008 Africa Cup of Nations in Ghana and the 2010 Africa Cup of Nations in Angola.

International goals
Scores and results list Tunisia's goal tally first.

Statistics

References 

Jemaa
Tunisia national football team